In the run up to the 2014 Indian general election, various organisations carried out opinion polls to gauge voting intention in India. Results of such polls are displayed in this article. The date range for these opinion polls are from the Jan 2013 to April 2014.  Many organisations have gone on to conduct exit polls and post-poll surveys as well, which too are displayed.

Background
Opinion polls in India can be controversial. These charges include partisan manipulation.

Opinion poll methodology has heavily improved and agencies like CSDS have got it absolutely correct on 16 occasions, roughly correct on 7 occasions and wrong on 4 occasions.

Post-poll surveys, widely published, are fundamentally different from opinion polls. According to a study, post-poll surveys in the past have consistently overestimated BJP seats.

Opinion polls

Seats

Votes

Graphs

Statewise opinion polling

Andhra Pradesh (42)

Arunachal Pradesh (2)

Assam (14)

Bihar (40)

Chhattisgarh (11)

Goa (2)

Gujarat (26)

Haryana (10)

Himachal Pradesh (4)

Jammu and Kashmir (6)

Jharkhand (14)

Karnataka (28)

Kerala (20)

Madhya Pradesh (29)

Maharashtra (48)

Manipur (2)

Meghalaya (2)

Mizoram (1)

Nagaland (1)

Odisha (21)

Punjab (13)

Rajasthan (25)

Sikkim (1)

Tamil Nadu (39)

Tripura (2)

Uttar Pradesh (80)

Uttarakhand (5)

West Bengal (42)

Union Territories

NCT of Delhi (7)

Other Union Territories (6)

Other findings

The eight largest metropolises in India are considered important because they constitute 31 seats, larger than some regions altogether. In the previous election, the INC-led UPA won 24 of these seats, but the UPA is trailing in these areas. A NDTV opinion poll in Uttar Pradesh indicated that the BJP would win its largest share of seats in the region by winning 40 of the 80 seats. BSP would get 15 seats, SP would get 13 seats, INC-RLD will get 12 seats, amongst its losses will Ajit Singh. The poll also asked those in Gujarat if Modi should run from U.P., of which 67% responded negatively, while those in U.P. said by 62% that they would like to see him run from there. A survey of first time voters suggested Modi was the most popular prime ministerial candidate and Mamata Banerjee was the most popular outside the BJP or INC. Latest survey by CNN-IBN-Lokniti predicts the decline (by 5%) in popularity of Narendra Modi as PM candidate.

Exit polls

Controversy

Polling agencies have been criticised by some political parties, intellectuals and political scholars. One of the limitations in making predictions is the modelling the relationship between vote share and the number of seats.

A controversy erupted when a lowly rated news channel News Express released footage of a sting operation named Operation Polly which alleged that a number of polling agencies were involved in malpractices such as juggling with the statistics and results. The sting was aimed to suggest that Polling agencies are fudging numbers. The allegation included global research Giants like Ipsos and CVoter, whose contract with the India Today group was suspended briefly.

References

External links
Election Commission of India website
Punjab Election Opinion Poll

2014 Indian general election
Opinion polling in India
India